Ethan Allen School is a K–8 school which is located in the Mayfair neighborhood of Philadelphia, Pennsylvania. It is part of the School District of Philadelphia.

History and architectural features
This historic school building was designed by Irwin T. Catharine and was built between 1929 and 1930.  A three-story, eight-bay, yellow brick building in the Art Deco style, it features an arched entryway with terra cotta trim, terra cotta cornice, and brick parapet.  It was named for patriot Ethan Allen.

It was added to the National Register of Historic Places in 1988.

Students zoned to Ethan Allen are also zoned to Abraham Lincoln High School.

References

External links
 Ethan Allen School
 

School buildings on the National Register of Historic Places in Philadelphia
Art Deco architecture in Pennsylvania
School buildings completed in 1930
Northeast Philadelphia
Public K–8 schools in Philadelphia
School District of Philadelphia
1930 establishments in Pennsylvania